Wayne Simonds is an Australian former professional rugby league footballer who played in the 1980s and 1990s, he played in the New South Wales Rugby League premiership, Australian Rugby League and Super League competitions.

Playing career
Simonds began his career with the Western Suburbs Magpies in 1988. Simons played for the Magpies for six seasons and scored 21 tries in 82 games.

Nearing the end of his career, Simonds left the Magpies in 1994, joining the Parramatta Eels. Simonds spent only one year with the club before joining the South Queensland Crushers for their inaugural 1995 season. In 1997, Simonds joined the new Adelaide Rams franchise and was also in their inaugural side. While remaining with the Rams in 1998, Simonds also played for the Wests Panthers in the Queensland Cup.

References

1966 births
Adelaide Rams players
Australian rugby league players
Featherstone Rovers players
Living people
Parramatta Eels players
Place of birth missing (living people)
Rugby league fullbacks
Rugby league wingers
South Queensland Crushers players
Western Suburbs Magpies players
Wests Panthers players